John Stephen Robinson, 2nd Baron Martonmere (born 12 July 1963) is a British peer.

Early life
He is the eldest son of Hon. Richard Anthony Gasque Robinson and Wendy Patricia Blagden. He has two siblings, David Alan Robinson and Carolyn Elizabeth Robinson.

His paternal grandparents were the former Maysie Gasque and Roland Robinson, 1st Baron Martonmere, a former Governor of Bermuda and MP for Blackpool South and Widnes who was created a baron by Queen Elizabeth II in 1964. His maternal grandfather was James Cecil Blagden, of Bapchild Court, Sittingbourne.

He attended Lakefield College School near Lakefield, Ontario (which was attended by King Felipe VI and Prince Andrew, Duke of York) before attending Seneca College in Toronto.

Career
As his father died in 1979, predeceasing his grandfather, John succeeded as the 2nd Baron Martonmere, of Blackpool in the County Palatine of Lancaster on 3 May 1989.

He was a member of the House of Lords until 1999 when all but 92 hereditary peers were expelled under the House of Lords Act 1999.

Personal life
On 15 December 2001, Lord Martonmere married Marion Elizabeth Wills, a daughter of Ian Malcolm Wills. Together, they are the parents of two children:

 Hon. James Ian Robinson (b. 2003)
 Hon. Andrew Roland Robinson (b. 2005)

References

1963 births
Living people
Lakefield College School alumni
Seneca College alumni
Barons in the Peerage of the United Kingdom
Martonmere